Edward Popham (by 1530 – 24 January 1586), of Huntworth, Somerset, was an English politician.

Family
He was the son of Alexander Popham, MP for Bridgwater, and his wife Joan née Stradling. On 1 July 1551, Edward married Jane Norton of Abbots Leigh, Bristol, and they had nine daughters and seven sons, including MP for Bridgwater, Alexander.

Career
He was a Member (MP) of the Parliament of England for Guildford in 1558, Hythe in 1563, and Bridgwater in 1571, 1572 and 1584.

References

1586 deaths
Politicians from Somerset
English MPs 1558
Year of birth uncertain
English MPs 1563–1567
English MPs 1571
English MPs 1572–1583
English MPs 1584–1585
Edward